Antonny Adrián Monreal de la Cruz (born 14 October 1994) is a Mexican professional footballer who plays as a goalkeeper for Liga FPD club Municipal Grecia.

References

1994 births
Living people
Mexican footballers
Association football goalkeepers
Mineros de Zacatecas players
Ascenso MX players
Liga Premier de México players
Footballers from Zacatecas
Liga de Expansión MX players